Madcap is a fictional supervillain appearing in American comic books published by Marvel Comics.

Publication history
Madcap first appeared in Captain America #307 (July 1985), and was created by Mark Gruenwald and Paul Neary.

Most of the villains Gruenwald introduced Captain America in were created to symbolize aspects of contemporary American culture and the world political situation. Gruenwald stated, "Madcap represents purposelessness, the disaffected youth of today who thinks 'What's the reason for doing anything?' The ultimate dropout generation."

Fictional character biography
Madcap (true name unknown) was originally a deeply religious young man. On the way to a picnic with his family and church community, their bus collides with a tanker truck full of Compound X07 (an experimental nerve agent developed by A.I.M.). Everyone aboard the bus, including his parents and sister Katy, are killed, leaving him as the only survivor, his body mixing with the Compound. When being told of the deaths of all his friends and family, his mind shatters, his belief in a rational universe swept away.

Leaving the hospital, he attempts suicide by throwing himself in front of traffic. He is injured but the wounds heal almost instantly. This pushes him further over the edge. After purchasing a toy soap bubble pistol from a dime store and donning a garish clown costume stolen from the Ace Costume Shop, the newly christened Madcap sets out to convince others that life is entirely without reason. Spewing absurdist philosophy, he runs rampant through the streets of Manhattan, causing mass chaos and a riot. Nomad tries to stop him, but Madcap uses his madness-inducing powers on him as well. Nomad recovers, tracks Madcap to a shack in an old fairground at Coney Island, and defeats him there.

Madcap is confined to a mental hospital but escapes. He gets back into costume and breaks up a shipment of illegal arms organized by the Rose. In the course of the fight he meets Dollar Bill, who runs a Manhattan public-access television cable TV show. The two film A Day in the Life of a Superhero, which is interrupted when Rose's underlings abduct Madcap. Taken to a warehouse, Madcap is tied up, beaten, and assaulted with an axe. Daredevil intervenes, but in the subsequent fight the warehouse is burned down, and Madcap ignores Daredevil's repeated appeals to get out of the fire. When his body is found, Madcap is declared legally dead but slowly returns to life while in the morgue. He returns to Dollar Bill's show.

While watching an episode of the show, a bored Katie Power and Franklin Richards of Power Pack decide that Madcap would be someone with whom they could go on an "adventure". Madcap agrees, but his idea of adventure is to cause chaos and confusion all over town and even go head-on to confront armed bank robbers. Katie and Franklin disapprove of his irreverent attitude, but it teaches the two pre-adolescents a lesson in responsibility.

Madcap encounters She-Hulk, and she defeats him on a day when she is trying to have a quiet walk in the park. Madcap is later captured by Vice and Triphammer of the Power Tools on the order of Dr. Karl Malus and is rescued by Hawkeye.

The Impossible Woman asks Madcap to teach her daughter Impia how to have fun. As part of his demonstration, Madcap uses his powers on Quasar.

Madcap exercises his power at Grand Central Station. By the time Ghost Rider arrives, the entire station is rampant with people murdering each other and killing themselves. Ghost Rider saves whomever he can, then beats Madcap and subjects him to the Penance Stare. Madcap feels all the pain he has caused his victims and likes it: it is the first real sensation he has felt in some time, and he vows to continue, in order to experience the Stare again. He later tries to escape from the Vault, a prison for superhumans and is stopped by Citizen V.

Silver Sable, leader of the country of Symkaria, hires a team of super-powered heroes to help protect a mad scientist from capture by the group Heroes for Hire. Sable believes one of her employees is the aforementioned Nomad but soon discovers she hired Madcap instead. The teams confront each other in the monastery of St. Eboar's, deep in Symkaria. Deadpool and Madcap each learn the other is hard to injure and, delighted, fight on that basis. Deadpool is overwhelmed and teleports out. Madcap, despite his chaotic nature, obeys orders, guarding Misty Knight and Colleen Wing. His bad Monty Python routines are interrupted by Deadpool, who temporarily defeats him with a blow that seemingly snaps Madcap's neck. Madcap returns minutes later to battle Deadpool once again. The entire incident, plus more, turns out to have been engineered by the villain Master of the World.

Madcap is among those considered by Blackout and the Deacon to help them assassinate Ghost Rider. He then works on a mission to kill Ghost Rider.

Madcap later appears as a member of the Shadow Council's incarnation of the Masters of Evil, at the time when the Secret Avengers raid Bagalia to recruit Taskmaster to their side.

Prior to the Secret Invasion, Madcap once again encounters Deadpool, and in the midst of an altercation with Daredevil and Thor, Thor's lightning reduces the two to a large pile of ash.  Though it initially seems that only Deadpool regenerates and survives, he eventually realizes the two actually regenerated as one being, with Madcap becoming one of the "voices" within Deadpool's head (explaining the appearance of a new, "extra" voice in Deadpool's appearances in Wolverine: Origins and Deadpool vol. 2).  After Madcap's personality asserts itself sufficiently to use his own powers in a later altercation with Thor and Luke Cage, Deadpool convinces Madcap to manipulate the two affected heroes into tearing Deadpool's body in half, with one half regenerating fully as Deadpool, and the other as Madcap.

Eight months after the events of Secret Wars, Madcap was revealed to have been psychologically damaged even further by his fusion with and separation from Deadpool. When Deadpool founded the Mercs for Money, Madcap infiltrated the team, feigning benevolence and incompetence. Madcap afterward began impersonating Deadpool, attacking the anti-hero's allies and using his powers to incite violence throughout New York City in Deadpool's name. Upon discovering that Madcap was responsible for the chaos, Deadpool lured him out by using his own daughter, Ellie, as bait, and confronted Madcap alongside Masacre, the Deadpool of Mexico. Madcap gained the upper hand in the brawl, which ended with him using Deadpool's own Chitaurian molecular disintegrator on himself. Afterward, Deadpool found himself being "haunted" by vivid hallucinations of Madcap.

Madcap resurfaces during Civil War II as a parasitic entity that is forcing its human host to act against Deadpool. After luring Deadpool to the Central Park Zoo, Madcap and his host infect him with a stolen virus that Deadpool begins unknowingly spreading to the people of New York City. Deadpool acquires a cure to the virus and locates Madcap, whose host is revealed to be Bob, Agent of Hydra. When Deadpool infers that everything that Madcap remembers about his past is a lie, an enraged Madcap detaches from Bob to attack him, and proceeds to escape under the cover of an explosion while swearing further revenge on Deadpool.

After Madcap nearly ruins his Valentine's Day, Deadpool ventures into space in search of a weapon that can permanently kill the villain, and while there he strikes a bargain with the Collector, who agrees to imprison Madcap in his museum. When Madcap seeks him out, Deadpool successfully ensnares "the indestructible clown" for the Collector. As Madcap is hauled away, Deadpool realizes that the victory is a hollow one after Madcap gloats that he no longer cares about ruining Deadpool's life, as Deadpool's recent dealings with Stryfe and Hydra have already accomplished that for him.

Powers and abilities
Madcap possesses two superpowers, as a result of the mutagenic effects of his exposure to Compound X07.
 He heals from any physical injury instantly, and even if he sustains enough damage to kill him (such as being flattened or having his neck snapped) or destroy him (such as being incinerated), he will immediately resurrect. Somehow linked to this is a total inability to perceive pain. The only time he ever felt pain was when Ghost Rider used his "penance stare" on him, and the period in which he was trapped in Deadpool's head. He can mentally control his severed limbs. His rapid healing ability also gives him phenomenal endurance, as his body both eliminates fatigue poisons and heals muscle damage caused by overexertion almost instantaneously.
 Madcap has a specialized form of insanity-inducement that immediately affects those he makes eye contact with. He wears a garish purple-and-yellow costume and uses a distracting toy soap bubble-gun, called a "fun-gun", to draw the attention of others towards him, so they can meet his gaze. The gun itself is a simple toy, having no offensive abilities. He has the ability to stimulate the inhibition centers in other people's brains. People affected by his power act in a euphoric, outlandish, uninhibited manner that verges on or becomes insanity and can end up killing themselves. Madcap cannot control how the person acts. The duration of the state seems to be approximately 15–30 minutes, though Madcap risks making a person "pleasantly loony" permanently if he makes additional eye contact with them. This power can interact unpredictably with individuals already affected with mental instability; for example, exposure initially seemed to have no effect on Deadpool, but then resulted in his experiencing a brief period of clarity and sanity. Later, his power's effect on normal humans seems to show that he can influence their behavior to some extent.

In other media

Video games
 The "white dialogue box" version of Madcap from the 2008 Deadpool comic book series appears in the 2013 Deadpool video game, fulfilling the same role as an additional "voice" in Deadpool's head.

References

External links
 Madcap at Marvel.com
 Madcap at Marvel Directory
 

Characters created by Mark Gruenwald
Characters created by Paul Neary
Comics characters introduced in 1985
Fictional empaths
Marvel Comics characters with accelerated healing
Marvel Comics mutates
Marvel Comics supervillains